The Bell House is a historic house at 302 West Woodruff Avenue in Searcy, Arkansas.  It is a single-story brick structure, with an irregular roofline.  A porch, headed by a side gable entrance projects to the right, continuing across the front to meet a small front-gable projecting in front of a higher front-facing gable roof.  The porch is supported by high brick piers topped by short wooden posts.  Built in 1915, it is a fine local example of Craftsman architecture.

The house was listed on the National Register of Historic Places in 1991.

See also
National Register of Historic Places listings in White County, Arkansas

References

Houses on the National Register of Historic Places in Arkansas
Houses completed in 1915
Houses in Searcy, Arkansas
National Register of Historic Places in Searcy, Arkansas
1915 establishments in Arkansas
American Craftsman architecture in Arkansas
Bungalow architecture in Arkansas